The Barbs was a band from Medway, Kent with a non-English member Amy who is from outback NSW Australia. With indie rock and punk-pop influences, the band was never particularly successful in their home country, however gained wider recognition in the Philippines in late 2004, with the single "Massive Crush". The UK release of the same record was Single of the Week on Lauren Laverne's XFM show, and was surprisingly played on BBC Radio 2 several times. The single received critical acclaim, with 4 Ks from Kerrang! and was, according to the NME, "The best song about killing your parents, stealing guitars and humping till dawn ever penned".

They also released an album, Lupine Peroxide.

On 1 December 2004, they were one of the headline acts at the MTV Staying Alive Music Summit, playing to a crowd of over 50,000. They also made several tours of the UK with bands such as The Rocks.

Illustrator Emma Renton initially designed two of the Barbs' single covers. Later, Jim Connolly was commissioned to produce comic book-style artwork for their remaining sleeves.

After the group broke up, guitarist Amy and guitarist/vocalist Tim went on to form What Would Jesus Drive? and were to release their album Black and Blue in 2011.

References

 The Barbs balks trends | The Manila Bulletin Newspaper Online
 About The Barbs | The Manila Bulletin Newspaper Online

English pop punk groups